Lawrence Patrick Smith [Paddy] (May 16, 1894 – December 2, 1990) was a backup catcher  in Major League Baseball who played briefly for the Boston Red Sox during the  season. A native of Pelham, New York, he attended Fordham University.

Smith appeared in two games for the Red Sox and went hitless in two at bats (.000). He did not have any fielding chances in one catching appearance.

Smith died at the age of 96 in New Rochelle, New York.

External links

1894 births
1990 deaths
Boston Red Sox players
Major League Baseball catchers
Fordham Rams baseball players
Baseball players from New York (state)
Sportspeople from New Rochelle, New York
People from Pelham, New York
Lewiston Cupids players
Pittsfield Hillies players
Burials at Gate of Heaven Cemetery (Hawthorne, New York)
Worcester Busters players